Mohammad Reza Aref (born 19 December 1951) is an Iranian engineer, academic and reformist politician who was the parliamentary leader of reformists' Hope fraction in the Iranian Parliament, representing Tehran, Rey, Shemiranat and Eslamshahr. Aref has also been heading the Reformists' Supreme Council for Policymaking since its establishment in 2015.He is currently member of the Expediency Discernment Council. 

He was the second first vice president from 2001 to 2005 under Mohammad Khatami. He previously served as Minister Information and Communications Technology and head of Management and Planning Organization in Khatami's first cabinet. He was a member of Supreme Council of the Cultural Revolution until the year of 2021, and the current member of Expediency Discernment Council. He is also an electrical engineer and a professor at University of Tehran and Sharif University of Technology. He was a candidate in the 2013 presidential election but withdrew his candidacy in order to give the reformist camp a better chance to win.

Early life and education

Aref was born on 19 December 1951 in Yazd. His father, Mirza Ahmad Aref, was a famous businessman.

He received a bachelor's degree in electronics engineering from the University of Tehran, and a master's degree and a PhD in electrical and communication engineering from Stanford University in 1975, 1976 and 1980, respectively. His PhD thesis was on the information theory of networks, supervised by Thomas M. Cover. He introduced and analyzed deterministic relay networks which is later termed as Aref Networks. During his education at Tehran University, he led many protests and was arrested by SAVAK prior to the Iranian Revolution.

Career
During his political career, Aref has held important positions in the Islamic Republic of Iran. Following the Islamic Revolution, he began his political career. His first major political post was in 1981 when he became vice president of communication company. He later became acting president of the company in 1983 and became deputy minister of science on the following year. Aref was a faculty member of Isfahan University of Technology until 1994.

Aref, who was a professor at University of Tehran, was elected as its chancellor in 1994. He began his career with creating Faculty of Social Sciences and also Institute of Geophysics. After his appointment as minister of technology, Aref was resigned as chancellor of the Tehran University in 1997.

After Mohammad Khatami was elected as President of Iran, he nominated Aref as the minister of post, telegraph, and telephone that was later renamed to minister of communications and information technology. He became the first head of management and planning organization in 2000 after resigned as Minister of Communication.

Khatami was reelected in 2001 and his former vice president Hassan Habibi resigned immediately after the election. After Habibi's resignation, he appointed Aref as his First Vice President. He served in this post until September 2005 and was succeeded by Parviz Dawoodi after the election of Mahmoud Ahmadinejad. Then, he served as a professor in the department of electrical engineering at Sharif University of Technology, offering courses on cryptography, coding theory, estimation theory and Information Theory. He is currently one of the members of the Expediency Discernment Council that is an advisory unit for Iran's Supreme Leader Ali Khamenei.

He was nominated for parliamentary election of 2008 as the reformist front's first in the list but he withdrew to protest the rejection of some candidates by the Guardian Council. In June 2013, Aref announced that he together with other reformist figures was planning to launch a national party, namely Hope of Iran. On the other hand, Iran's president-elect Hassan Rouhani stated that Aref will be one of his cabinet members. However, Aref rejected Rouhani's invite for a political post (Vice Presidency or Ministry of Science) to focus on his party's establishment. He also announced his interest in becoming one of Rouhani's advisers in politics and human rights.

2013 presidential election

Aref was one of the potential candidates for the presidential elections held in June 2013. He said that he would not stand if Khatami run but after Khatami declined, Aref announced that he would run in the election. He registered on 11 May 2013 and was confirmed by the Guardian Council. His major goals were lowering the unemployment rate and resolving high inflation. He pledged an extra 1 million jobs annually, which would include 200 thousand jobs from tourism development. He also added that if elected, his administration would bolster Iran's international relations and would find a "political solution" to closing the "[nuclear] dossier once and for all". Aref said he would remain "committed to the law" throughout the election process, promising to implement an economic plan to propel the country out of inflation and to achieve development and progress. Aref censured the foreign policy of the Ahmadinejad's administration, vowing to improve Iran's diplomatic ties with other countries if elected president. He added that the next administration can have friendly ties with the world and improve the conditions in the country through such relations. Aref also said he would pursue and implement plans to further the presence and participation of the youth in various arenas of the country. Vowing to tackle unemployment, Aref said he aimed all-out development in various political, cultural, economical and social fields.
"By implementing the subsidy reform plan I will put bread on the tables. I have come to eradicate inflation and create one million job opportunities every year",

Aref also said he is a reformist and reform means safeguarding the ideals of the Islamic Revolution, accountability and encouraging popular participation. He also called for investigation of alleged fraud in the 2009 election and trial of effects in Death of Neda Agha Soltan and other deaths in the protests.

Aref announced his decision to drop out of the election in a statement issued late on 11 June, in which he said the decision was made after he received suggestions from former President Mohammad Khatami, who advised to stand aside. He also called on the Iranian people to vote en masse in the upcoming presidential election to create a political epic and maintain the dignity of the Islamic Republic of Iran.

2016 legislative election
On 4 November 2014, Aref announced he will run for Parliament of Iran in the 2016 election from Tehran, Rey, Shemiranat and Eslamshahr district. He officially run for the seat on 22 December 2015. He was also named as the Pervasive Coalition of Reformists' head list.

He was elected to the Parliament with 1,608,926 votes which was the highest in the election. All other 29 Reformists candidates also run to the parliament, the first time since 1980 that all candidates are run from same party in Tehran district.

Personal life
Aref married Hamideh Moravvej Farshi in 1976. Hamideh has a PhD in dermatology and also works at the ministry of science. They have three sons.

In 2017, his son Hamid Reza said in an interview "I'm proud that [my] capabilities come from 'good genes'...", which sparked controversy.

References

External links

|-

1951 births
Living people
Stanford University School of Engineering alumni
University of Tehran alumni
Iranian electrical engineers
First vice presidents of Iran
Government ministers of Iran
Iranian Vice Ministers
Academic staff of Sharif University of Technology
Academic staff of the University of Tehran
Chancellors of the University of Tehran
People from Yazd
Members of the Expediency Discernment Council
Candidates for President of Iran
Members of the 10th Islamic Consultative Assembly
Heads of reformist fractions in Islamic Consultative Assembly
Islamic Iran Participation Front politicians
Members of the Reformists' Supreme Council for Policymaking
Iranian campaign managers
Academy of Sciences of Iran members
Distinguished professors in Iran